Bosnich is a surname, probably simplified Bosnić. Notable people with the surname include:

Brice Bosnich (1936–2015), Australian chemist
Dean Bosnich (born 1980), Australian rugby league footballer
Mark Bosnich (born 1972), Australian soccer player and sports pundit